The 1856 United States presidential election in Maine took place on November 4, 1856, as part of the 1856 United States presidential election. Voters chose eight representatives, or electors to the Electoral College, who voted for president and vice president.

Maine voted for the Republican candidate, John C. Frémont, over the Democratic candidate, James Buchanan, and the Know Nothing candidate, Millard Fillmore. Frémont won the state by a margin of 25.66%.

With 61.34% of the popular vote, Maine would prove to be Frémont's third strongest state in the 1856 election after Vermont and Massachusetts.

Results

See also
 United States presidential elections in Maine

References

Maine
1856
1856 Maine elections